This is a list of Danish television related events from 1970.

Events

Debuts

Television shows

Ending this year

Births
12 June - Natasja Crone Back, journalist & TV host
9 July - Lai Yde, actor

Deaths

See also
1970 in Denmark